Emmanuel "Manu" Godfroid (born 16 August 1972 in Huy, Belgium) is a Belgian former football player who also worked as head coach at RFC Herve II.

Achievements

Rapid București

 Divizia A : 2002–03
 Romanian Super Cup: 2002

References

External links

1972 births
Living people
Belgian footballers
Association football midfielders
Royal Antwerp F.C. players
Standard Liège players
RFC Liège players
Belgian Pro League players
Liga I players
FC Rapid București players
Belgian expatriate footballers
Belgian expatriate sportspeople in Romania
Expatriate footballers in Romania
People from Huy
Footballers from Liège Province